Bari Bahu is a 2015 Pakistani drama serial directed by Furqan Adam, produced by A&B Entertainment and written by Shakeel Ahmed. The drama stars Maira Khan, Shahood Alvi, Suzain Fatima and Azra Aftab in lead roles, and was first aired on 16 November 2016 on Geo Entertainment, where it aired twice a week.

Plot 
Drama serial ‘Bari Bahu’ revolves around domestic politics in a family. Mona possesses typical eastern wife materials like a loving, caring and docile personality, whose husband happens to be as angelic as she is. Although Mona’s husband is quite mature and responsible, who is always sacrificing to strengthen the family bond, her brother-in-law Naeem has personality traits totally opposite. He is naturally corrupt, scheming and artful fellow. Their one and only sister Shehla is married with maternal cousin, Asif.

Mona is the eldest daughter-in-law in this joint household system which is led by a matriarch. Naeem’s habit of taking advantage and emotionally blackmailing his elder brother for money soon come into notice. Mona silently observes his actions. Later on, Naeem is then joined by Asif in his diabolic schemes against Mona and his brother. Different kinds of jiggery-pokery and domestic politics come into limelight as the play progresses towards conclusion.

Cast
Azra Aftab
Shahood Alvi
Maira Khan
Suzain Fatima
Imran Rizvi
Amir Qureshi
Salina Sipra
Beena Chaudhary as Mona's mother-in-law
Shahzad Malik

References

Pakistani family television dramas
Geo TV original programming
2015 Pakistani television series debuts
2015 Pakistani television series endings